Justus Moak Scrafford (January 7, 1878 in Washington Mills, New York – February 6, 1947 in Syracuse, New York) was an American track and field athlete who competed at the 1900 Summer Olympics in Paris, France.

Scrafford competed in the 800 metres.  He placed third in his first-round (semifinals) heat and did not advance to the final.

He was also a member of the Philadelphia Relay Team of 1901 along with Harry L. Gardner, Foster S. Post, and Myer Prinstein, the captain of the team.

References

External links

 De Wael, Herman. Herman's Full Olympians: "Athletics 1900". Accessed 18 March 2006.
 
 Jewish Hall of Fame: "Myer Prinstein". Accessed 29 September 2007.

1878 births
1947 deaths
Athletes (track and field) at the 1900 Summer Olympics
Olympic track and field athletes of the United States
American male middle-distance runners
People from New Hartford, New York
Track and field athletes from New York (state)
Syracuse Orange men's track and field athletes
Syracuse University faculty